Wibsey is a ward in the metropolitan borough of the City of Bradford, West Yorkshire, England.  It contains 69 listed buildings that are recorded in the National Heritage List for England.  Of these, one is listed at Grade II*, the middle of the three grades, and the others are at Grade II, the lowest grade.  The ward is to the south of the centre of Bradford, it is almost completely residential, and most of the listed buildings are cottages and houses.  The other listed buildings include churches, public houses, schools, and a former sports centre.


Key

Buildings

References

Citations

Sources

 

Lists of listed buildings in West Yorkshire
Listed